Anthene, or Anthana (Ἀνθάνα), or Athene (Ἀθήνη), was a town in Cynuria, originally inhabited by the Aeginetans, and mentioned by Thucydides along with Thyrea, as the two chief places in Cynuria.

Its site is tentatively located near the modern Mt. Zavitsa and Kato Doliana.

See also
 Archaeological Museum of Astros
 Thyrea

References

Populated places in ancient Argolis
Populated places in ancient Laconia
Former populated places in Greece
Cities in ancient Peloponnese